Carlos Heber Bueno Suárez (born 10 May 1980) is a Uruguayan professional footballer who plays for Artigas F.C. as a striker.

Club career
Born in Artigas, Artigas Department, Bueno started his career at C.A. Peñarol. He moved abroad in 2005, signing for French club Paris Saint-Germain F.C. and being rarely used during the season.

In July 2006, Bueno was loaned to Sporting CP. His biggest moment of the campaign occurred when he scored four goals (all of his Primeira Liga ones) in 20 minutes in a match against C.D. Nacional on 3 February 2007 – the Lisbon side won 5–1, and the player was just featured in the final thirty minutes.

In August 2007, PSG sold Bueno to Argentina's Boca Juniors, where he played until the end of 2007, returning to Peñarol early in the following year. For 2009–10 he moved to Real Sociedad in the Spanish second division, following the departure of countryman Sebastián Abreu who left for Aris Thessaloniki FC; on 5 June 2010 he scored a hat-trick in a 3–1 win at Cádiz CF, as they eventually returned to La Liga after an absence of three years, as league champions.

In August 2010, Bueno moved to Club Universidad de Chile, making his debut against Municipal Iquique in a 2–0 away success which qualified for the Copa Sudamericana. On the 15th he scored his first goal for the team, against Everton de Viña del Mar in a 5–1 triumph (also away), coming off the bench at Estadio Francisco Sánchez Rumoroso in Coquimbo; nine days later he also found the net against Oriente Petrolero of Bolivia, in a 2–2 home draw and 2–3 aggregate loss.

In early December 2010, Bueno agreed to join Querétaro F.C. after playing for Universidad in the qualifying rounds for the following year's Copa Libertadores.<ref>[http://www.terra.cl/deportes/index.cfm?accion=futbolnacional&id_reg=1551075 La U sufre su primera baja para el 2011: Carlos Bueno parte al fútbol de México (''La Us first casualty for 2001: Carlos Bueno leave for Mexican football)] ; Terra, 7 December 2010 (in Spanish)</ref> However, his agent denied any transfer had occurred by saying that the player would respect his contract until 2012, but he finally signed a three-year deal with the Mexican club.

After leaving the Estadio Corregidora in late 2012 at the age of 32, Bueno went on to represent in quick succession Club Deportivo Universidad Católica, Club Atlético Belgrano, San Martín de San Juan, Club Atlético Sarmiento, Argentinos Juniors (all four in the Argentine Primera División), Liverpool F.C. (Montevideo) and Santa Tecla FC.Uruguayo Carlos Bueno reveló su toque con el Santa Tecla (Uruguayan Carlos Bueno showed his skills with Santa Tecla); El Gráfico, 2 February 2017 (in Spanish) He retired in May 2017, after four months with the latter club.Carlos Bueno: “Me voy porque no tengo nada más que dar” (Carlos Bueno: “I leave because I have nothing more to give”); El Gráfico, 24 May 2017 (in Spanish)

Bueno came out of his short-lived retirement in February 2018, with the 37-year-old signing with Uruguayan Segunda División's Cerro Largo FC. He scored twice in his debut, helping the hosts defeat Miramar Misiones 4–0. In 2020, he began playing for Artigas F.C. in his hometown Artigas.

International career
Bueno's debut for Uruguay came against Argentina on 16 July 2003, in a 2–2 draw played in La Plata. Subsequently, he played for the national team in the 2004 Copa América, scoring three goals in four matches.

International goals
Scores and results list Uruguay's goal tally first.

HonoursPeñarolUruguayan Primera División: 1999, 2003Paris Saint-GermainCoupe de France: 2005–06SportingTaça de Portugal: 2006–07Real SociedadSegunda División: 2009–10Santa Tecla'''
Salvadoran Primera División: 2016–17

References

External links
 
 
 Argentine League statistics 
 
 
  
 
 
 

1980 births
Living people
Uruguayan footballers
Association football forwards
Uruguayan Primera División players
Uruguayan Segunda División players
Peñarol players
Liverpool F.C. (Montevideo) players
Cerro Largo F.C. players
Ligue 1 players
Paris Saint-Germain F.C. players
Primeira Liga players
Sporting CP footballers
Argentine Primera División players
Primera Nacional players
Boca Juniors footballers
San Lorenzo de Almagro footballers
Club Atlético Belgrano footballers
San Martín de San Juan footballers
Argentinos Juniors footballers
Segunda División players
Real Sociedad footballers
Chilean Primera División players
Club Deportivo Universidad Católica footballers
Universidad de Chile footballers
Liga MX players
Querétaro F.C. footballers
Santa Tecla F.C. footballers
Uruguay international footballers
2004 Copa América players
Uruguayan expatriate footballers
Expatriate footballers in France
Expatriate footballers in Portugal
Expatriate footballers in Argentina
Expatriate footballers in Spain
Expatriate footballers in Chile
Expatriate footballers in Mexico
Expatriate footballers in El Salvador
Uruguayan expatriate sportspeople in France
Uruguayan expatriate sportspeople in Portugal
Uruguayan expatriate sportspeople in Argentina
Uruguayan expatriate sportspeople in Spain
Uruguayan expatriate sportspeople in Chile
Uruguayan expatriate sportspeople in Mexico